SOAS University of London (the School of Oriental and African Studies) is a public research university in London, England, and a member institution of the federal University of London.  Founded in 1916, SOAS is located in the Bloomsbury area of central London.

SOAS is one of the world's leading institutions for the study of Asia, Africa, and the Middle East. Its library is one of the five national research libraries in England. SOAS also houses the Brunei Gallery, which hosts a programme of changing contemporary and historical exhibitions from Asia, Africa, and the Middle East with the aim of presenting and promoting cultures from these regions. The annual income of the institution for 2021–22 was £98.0 million of which £6.1 million was from research grants and contracts, with an expenditure of £117.8 million.

SOAS is divided into three faculties: Faculty of Arts and Humanities, Faculty of Languages and Cultures, and Faculty of Law and Social Sciences which includes the SOAS School of Law. The university offers around 350 bachelor's degree combinations, more than 100 one-year master's degrees, and PhD programmes in nearly every department. The university has produced several heads of states, government ministers, diplomats, central bankers, Supreme Court judges, a Nobel Peace Prize Laureate, and many other notable leaders around the world. SOAS is a member of the Association of Commonwealth Universities.

History

Origins
The School of Oriental Studies was founded in 1916 at 2 Finsbury Circus, London, the then premises of the London Institution. The school received its royal charter on 5 June 1916 and admitted its first students on 18 January 1917. The school was formally inaugurated a month later on 23 February 1917 by George V. Among those in attendance were Earl Curzon of Kedleston, formerly Viceroy of India, and other cabinet officials.

The School of Oriental Studies was founded by the British state as an instrument to strengthen Britain's political, commercial, and military presence in Asia and Africa. It would do so by providing instruction to colonial administrators (Colonial Service and Imperial Civil Service), commercial managers, and military officers, as well as to missionaries, doctors, and teachers, in the language of the part of Asia or Africa to which each was being posted, together with an authoritative introduction to the customs, religions, laws, and history of the people whom they were to govern or among whom they would be working.

The school's founding mission was to advance British scholarship, science, and commerce in Africa and Asia, and to provide London University with a rival to the Oriental schools of Berlin, Petrograd, and Paris. The school immediately became integral to training British administrators, colonial officials, and spies for overseas postings across the British Empire. Africa was added to the school's name in 1938.

Second World War
For a period in the mid-1930s, prior to moving to its current location at Thornhaugh Street, Bloomsbury, the school was located at Vandon House, Vandon Street, London SW1, with the library located at Clarence House. Its move to new premises in Bloomsbury was held up by delays in construction and the half-completed building took a hit during the Blitz in September 1940. With the onset of the Second World War, many University of London colleges were evacuated from London in 1939 and billeted on universities in the rest of the country. The School was, on the Government's advice, transferred to Christ's College, Cambridge.

In 1940, when it became apparent that a return to London was possible, the school returned to the city and was housed for some months in eleven rooms at Broadway Court, 8 Broadway, London SW1. In 1942, the War Office joined with the School to create a scheme for State Scholarships to be offered to select grammar and public school boys with linguistic ability to train as military translators and interpreters in Chinese, Japanese, Persian, and Turkish. Lodged at Dulwich College in south London, the students became affectionately known as the Dulwich boys. One of these students was Charles Dunn, who became a prominent Japanologist on the faculty of the SOAS and a recipient of the Order of the Rising Sun. Others included Sir Peter Parker and Professor Ronald Dore. Subsequently, the School ran a series of courses in Japanese, both for translators and for interpreters.

1945–present

In recognition of SOAS's role during the war, the 1946 Scarborough Commission (officially the "Commission of Enquiry into the Facilities for Oriental, Slavonic, East European and African Studies") report recommended a major expansion in provision for the study of Asia and the school benefited greatly from the subsequent largesse. The SOAS School of Law was established in 1947 with Professor Seymour Gonne Vesey-FitzGerald as its first head. Growth however was curtailed by following years of economic austerity, and upon Sir Cyril Philips assuming the directorship in 1956, the school was in a vulnerable state. Over his 20-year stewardship, Phillips transformed the school, raising funds and broadening the school's remit.

A college of the University of London, the School's fields include Law, Social Sciences, Humanities, and Languages with special reference to Asia and Africa. The SOAS Library, located in the Philips Building, is the UK's national resource for materials relating to Asia and Africa and is the largest of its kind in the world. The school has grown considerably over the past 30 years, from fewer than 1,000 students in the 1970s to more than 6,000 students today, nearly half of them postgraduates. SOAS is partnered with the Institut National des Langues et Civilisations Orientales (INALCO) in Paris which is often considered the French equivalent of SOAS.

In 2011, the Privy Council approved changes to the school's charter allowing it to award degrees in its own name, following the trend set by fellow colleges the London School of Economics, University College London and King's College London. All new students registered from September 2013 will qualify for a SOAS, University of London, award.

In 2012, a new visual identity for SOAS was launched to be used in print, digital media and around the campus. The SOAS tree symbol, first implemented in 1989, was redrawn and recoloured in gold, with the new symbol incorporating the leaves of ten trees, including the English Oak representing England; the Bodhi, Coral Bark Maple, Teak representing Asia; the Mountain Acacia, African Pear, Lasiodiscus representing Africa; and the Date Palm, Pomegranate and Ghaf representing the Middle East.

Controversies on campus

Antisemitism 
Dating back to at least 2005, SOAS has faced a number of accusations of systemic antisemitism and anti-Israel rhetoric by its Student Union and members of its faculty, and for failing to adequately address antisemitism on campus. A report in the Jewish Tribune titled SOAS as "the School Of Anti-Semitism." In 2015, the SOAS Student Union held a referendum in which its members voted to adopt the Boycott, Divestment and Sanctions agenda and boycott Israel. In a motion for a "Jewish Equality Act" passed in 2017, the Student Union voted to remove a line stating, "Jewish students should be given the right to self-determination and be able to define what constitutes hatred against their group like all other minority groups." Jewish students at SOAS have reported feeling unable to express themselves in a Jewish way, and fear hate and retribution if they wear Jewish symbols or speak Hebrew on campus. In their annual "University Extreme Speakers" report, the Henry Jackson Society claims that SOAS has been responsible for hosting 70 (16%) of the 435 events that featured extremist speakers over the past three years, putting up 43 speakers who have previously made pro-jihadi or antisemitic remarks over the past year.

In December 2020 The Guardian reported that SOAS refunded a student £15,000 in fees after he chose to abandon his studies as a result of the "toxic antisemitic environment" he felt had been allowed to develop on campus.

Campus

The campus is located in the Bloomsbury area of central London, close to Russell Square. It includes College Buildings (the Philips Building and the Old Building), Brunei Gallery building, 53 Gordon Square (which houses the Doctoral School) and, since 2016, the Paul Webley Wing (the North Block of Senate House). The SOAS library designed by Sir Denys Lasdun in 1973 is located in the Philips Building. The nearest Underground station is Russell Square.

The school houses the Brunei Gallery, built from an endowment from the Sultan of Brunei Darussalam, the leader of a country whose human rights abuses are ongoing, and inaugurated by the Princess Royal, as Chancellor of the University of London, on 22 November 1995. Its facilities include exhibition space on three floors, a book shop, a lecture theatre, and conference and teaching facilities. The Brunei Gallery hosts a programme of changing contemporary and historical exhibitions from Asia, Africa and the Middle East with the aim to present and promote cultures from these regions.

The Japanese-style roof garden on top of the Brunei Gallery was built during the Japan 2001 celebrations and was opened by the sponsor, Haruhisa Handa, an Honorary Fellow of the School, on 13 November 2001.

The school hosted the Percival David Foundation of Chinese Art, one of the foremost collections of Chinese ceramics in Europe. The collection has been loaned to the British Museum, where it is now on permanent display in Room 95.

The SOAS Centenary Masterplan conceived the development of two new buildings and a substantial remodelling of existing space to realign and develop the entrance and two areas within the Old Building. The cost estimates for the Centenary Masterplan settle at around £73m for the total project. The full implementation of the School's Centenary Masterplan would deliver approximately 30% additional space, approximately 1,000 sq metres.

Organisation and administration

Governance

Presidents

Directors

Since its foundation, the school has had nine directors. The inaugural director was the celebrated linguist Sir Edward Denison Ross. Under the stewardship of Sir Cyril Philips, the school saw considerable growth and modernisation. Under Colin Bundy in the 2000s, the school became one of the top ranked universities both domestically and internationally. In January 2021 Professor Adam Habib became director of SOAS in place of Baroness Valerie Amos, who had taken up the position of Master at University College, Oxford.

Faculties and departments
SOAS, University of London is divided into three faculties. These are further divided into academic departments. SOAS has many Centres and Institutes, each of which is affiliated to a particular faculty.

Faculty of Arts and Humanities
The Faculty of Arts and Humanities houses the departments of Anthropology & Sociology, History of Art & Archaeology, History, Music, Philosophy and Religious Studies and the Centre for Media Studies. It offers courses at the undergraduate and postgraduate levels, with an emphasis on Asia, Africa, and the Middle East. A gift from the Alphawood Foundation in 2013 created the Hiram W. Woodward Chair in Southeast Asian art, the David Snellgrove Senior Lectureship in Tibetan and Buddhist art, and a Senior Lectureship in Curating and Museology of Asian Art, as well as a number of scholarships for students, making the Department of Art & Archaeology a key institution at a global level in the study of Southeast Asia. The university is also a member of the Screen Studies Group, London.

Faculty of Languages and Cultures
 Department of Linguistics
The SOAS Department of Linguistics was the first ever linguistics department in the United Kingdom, founded in 1932 as a centre for research and study in Oriental and African languages. J. R. Firth, known internationally for his work in phonology and semantics, was a Senior Lecturer, Reader and Professor of General Linguistics at the school between 1938 and 1956.

Faculty of Law and Social Sciences
The Faculty of Law and Social Sciences houses the departments of Development Studies, Economics, Financial and Management Studies, Politics and International Studies and the School of Law, as well as the London Asia-Pacific Centre for Social Science, the Centre for Gender Studies, the Centre for International Studies and Diplomacy, the Centre of Taiwan Studies and a number of department-specific centres. It offers courses at the undergraduate and postgraduate levels, many with an emphasis on Asia, Africa, and the Middle East.

 SOAS School of Law

One of the largest individual departments, the SOAS School of Law is one of Britain's leading law schools and the sole law school in the world focusing on the study of Asian, African and Middle Eastern legal systems. The School of Law has more than 400 students. It offers programmes at the LL.B., LL.M. and MPhil/PhD levels. International students have been a majority at all levels for many years.

The SOAS School of Law has an unrivaled concentration of expertise in the laws of Asian and African countries, human rights, transnational commercial law, environmental law, and comparative law. The SOAS School of Law was ranked 15th out of all 98 British law schools by The Guardian League Table in 2016.

Although many modules at SOAS embody a substantial element of English common law, all modules are taught (as much as possible) in a comparative or international manner with an emphasis on the way in which law functions in society. Thus, law studies at SOAS are broad and comparative in their orientation. All students study a significant amount of non-English law, starting in the first year of the LL.B. course, where "Legal Systems of Asia and Africa" is compulsory. Specialised modules in the laws and legal systems of particular countries and regions are also encouraged, and faculty experts conduct modules in these subjects every year.

Academic profile

SOAS is a centre for the study of subjects concerned with Asia, Africa and the Middle East. It trains government officials on secondment from around the world in Asian, African and Middle Eastern languages and area studies, particularly in Arabic & Islamic Studies – which combined with Hebrew formed the major bulk of classical Oriental Studies in Europe – and Mandarin Chinese. It also acts as a consultant to government departments and to companies such as Accenture and Deloitte – when they seek to gain specialist knowledge of the matters concerning Asia, Africa and the Middle East.

The school is made up of nineteen departments across three faculties: Arts and Humanities, Languages and Cultures, and Law and Social Sciences. The school focuses on small group teaching with a student-staff ratio of 11:1, one of the lowest in the UK.

Library

The SOAS library is a library for Asian, African and Middle Eastern studies. It houses more than 1.2 million volumes and electronic resources for the study of Africa, Asia and the Middle East, and attracts scholars from all over the world. The library was designated by HEFCE in 2011 as one of the UK's five National Research Libraries.

The library is housed in the Philips Building on the Russell Square campus and was built in 1973. It was designed by architect Sir Denys Lasdun, who also designed some of Britain's most famous brutalist buildings such as the National Theatre and the Institute of Education.

In 2010/11 the library underwent a £12 million modernisation programme, known as "the Library Transformation Project". The work refurbished the ground floor of the library and created new reception and entrance areas, new music practice rooms, group study rooms and a gallery exhibition space.

SOAS being a constituent college of the University of London, its students also have access to Senate House Library, shared by other colleges such as London School of Economics and University College London, which is located just a short walk from the Russell Square campus.

The library was used as a filming location for some scenes in the 2016 film Criminal.

Rankings

The 2022 QS World University Rankings placed SOAS 2nd in the world for Development Studies, 10th for Anthropology and 15th for Politics. For Arts & Humanities overall, it was placed 67th in the world by the same rankings. As an institution, it placed 443rd overall in the QS World University Rankings 2023. SOAS ranked 33rd globally for International Students and 49th for International Faculty in the 2023 QS World University Rankings.

SOAS's Department of Financial and Management Studies (DeFiMS) is ranked within the top-60 for Business Studies in the 2023 Complete University Guide's League Table. The research strength of the department has been previously recognised by the 2021 Research Excellence Framework (REF) where 81 per cent was rated as world-leading and internationally excellent, placing it 41st in the country by GPA.

The results of the 2021 REF took the form of profiles spread across four grade levels. Hence, there are different ways to present them and to rank the departments. According to published tables by Times Higher Education, SOAS is ranked 4th by GPA in the UK for Anthropology (an improvement from 16th in the previous exercise in 2014) and 25th in the UK for Development Studies.

Scholarships, bursaries, and awards
A range of scholarships and awards support SOAS degree programmes, with an application process based either on academic merit or with a focus on supporting students from specific countries or connected with particular areas of study, as well as some bursaries addressing students' financial needs.

Publications 
SOAS publishes academic journals such as The China Quarterly,Bulletin of the School of Oriental & African Studies, Journal of African Law, South East Asia Research and SOAS Bulletin of Burma Research.

Student life

In , there were  undergraduate students In 2012, 41% of students were over 21 and 60% were female. According to the QS World University Rankings, SOAS hosts international students from 140 countries.

SOAS is renowned for its political scene and radical socialist politics, and was voted the most politically active university in the UK in the Which?University 2012. Recent campaigns include students for social change, women's liberty and justice for cleaners. The SOAS Marxist Society holds frequent events and encourages student voter registration.

Located in the heart of Bloomsbury, many University of London schools and institutes are close by, including Birkbeck, the Institute of Education, London Business School, the London School of Hygiene & Tropical Medicine, the Royal Veterinary College, the School of Advanced Study, Senate House Library and University College London.

Sports

SOAS has multiple smaller sports teams competing in a variety of local and national leagues, as well as occasional international tournaments. SOAS clubs compete in inter-university fixtures in the British Universities and Colleges Sport (BUCS) competition in a range of sports, including basketball, football, hockey, netball, rugby union and tennis. SOAS also participates in an annual North London Varsity tournament against London Metropolitan University.

Student housing

SOAS operates two halls of residence in central London, both owned by Sanctuary Student Housing.
The primary accommodation for undergraduates is Dinwiddy House, which is located on Pentonville Road. This contains 510 single en-suite rooms arranged in small cluster flats of around six rooms each. The halls are located within minutes of King's Cross St Pancras tube station and the Vernon Square campus.

A few minutes walk from Dinwiddy House and also on the Pentonville Road is Paul Robeson House, the second hall of residence. This was opened in 1998, and is named after the African-American musician Paul Robeson who studied at SOAS in the 1930s. This accommodation is occupied by postgraduate students, and those attending the international SOAS Summer schools.

SOAS students are eligible to apply for places in the University of London intercollegiate halls of residence. The majority of these are based in Bloomsbury such as Canterbury Hall, Commonwealth Hall, College Hall, Connaught Hall, Hughes Parry Hall, International Hall and International Students House, while further afield are Nutford House in Marble Arch and Lillian Penson Hall in Paddington.  A number of SOAS postgraduate students also apply for student accommodation at Goodenough College.

Notable people

Notable alumni

SOAS alumni have made significant contributions in the fields of government and politics. These include Sultan Salahuddin, King of Malaysia (1999–2001), Mette-Marit, Crown Princess of Norway, Princess Ayşe Gülnev Sultan, descendant of Mehmed V Reşâd, 35th Sultan of the Ottoman Empire, John Atta Mills, former President of Ghana, Luisa Diogo, former Prime Minister of Mozambique, Bülent Ecevit, former Prime Minister of Turkey.

Around the world, several national leaders and political figures are alumni: Aung San Suu Kyi, Nobel Peace Prize laureate and First and incumbent State Counsellor of Myanmar, Zairil Khir Johari, Member of the Malaysian Parliament, Amal Pepple, Minister of Lands, Housing and Urban Development in Nigeria, Aaron Mike Oquaye, Speaker of Parliament and former Minister of Communication in Ghana, Hüseyin Çelik, Turkish Minister of Education, Femi Fani-Kayode, former Nigerian Minister of Culture and Tourism and former Minister of Aviation, Kraisak Choonhavan, Former Senator in Thailand, Samia Nkrumah, Hammad Azhar, Former Pakistan Minister for Economic Affairs and Minister for Industries and Production, Ghanaian Member of Parliament and Mohamed Jameel Ahmed, 4th Vice President of the Maldives. In British politics, several current and former Members of Parliament are alumni: David Lammy, Catherine West, Tim Yeo, Ivor Stanbrook, Sir Ray Whitney, Enoch Powell.

 In government, alumni include Dharma Vira, who served as 8th Cabinet Secretary of India, Johnnie Carson, former US Ambassador to Kenya, Zimbabwe and Uganda, Hassan Taqizadeh, Iranian Ambassador to the UK, Sir Shridath Ramphal, Secretary-General of the Commonwealth, Sir Leslie Fielding, British diplomat and former European Commission Ambassador to Tokyo, Sir David Warren, former UK Ambassador to Japan, Quinton Quayle, UK Ambassador to Thailand and Lao, Sir Robin McLaren, UK Ambassador to China and the Philippines, Sir Michael Weir, UK Ambassador to Egypt, Jemima Khan, UK Ambassador to UNICEF, Hugh Carless, UK Ambassador to Venezuela, Francis K. Butagira, Ambassador and Permanent Representative, Mission of the Republic of Uganda to the United Nations, Gunapala Malalasekera, Sri Lankan Ambassador to UK, Canada and Soviet Union, Michael C Williams, UN Special Coordinator for Lebanon, Guillaume Long, former Foreign Minister of Ecuador, Haifa al-Mogrin - Saudi Arabia's delegate to UNESCO.
 In justice, Idris Kutigi, Chief Justice of the Supreme Court of Nigeria, Sylvester Umaru Onu, Judge of the Supreme Court of Nigeria, Herbert Chitepo, first Black Rhodesian Barrister, John Vinelott, lawyer and judge.
 Prominent journalists and broadcasters such as, Abdel Bari Atwan, editor-in-chief of Al-Quds Al-Arabi newspaper in London, Zeinab Badawi, presenter of BBC World News Today, Martin Bright, political editor of the Jewish Chronicle, Jung Chang, who is best known for her family autobiography Wild Swans, Hossein Derakhshan, Iranian blogger credited with starting the blogging revolution in Iran, Jamal Elshayyal, news producer at Al Jazeera English, Ghida Fakhry, news anchor at Al Jazeera English, James Harding, head of BBC News and former editor of The Times, Lindsey Hilsum, Channel 4 News correspondent and columnist for the New Statesman, Swapan Dasgupta, Indian journalist and public intellectual, Dom Joly, television comedian and journalist, Elan Journo, Fellow and Director of Policy Research at the Ayn Rand Institute, Clive King, author of Stig of the Dump, Freya Stark, travel writer, James Longman, former BBC journalist, now ABC News foreign correspondent and Rupert Wingfield-Hayes, BBC's Tokyo correspondent.
 In academia, SOAS alumni include: Edith Penrose, economics scholar, Simon Digby, oriental scholar, Kusuma Karunaratne, Sri Lankan academic, university administrator, Professor and scholar of Sinhalese language and literature, Wang Gungwu, Australian historian of Asia, Sir Martin Harris, educationalist, Gregory B. Lee, sinologist, Bernard Lewis, Orientalist, Duncan McCargo, political scientist, Robert L. McKenzie, scholar-cum-public commentator on forced migration and refugees, Than Tun, historian of Burma, Ivan van Sertima, historian and anthropologist, Abdur Rahman ibn Yusuf Mangera, contemporary Muslim jurist and scholar, William Montgomery Watt, Islamic scholar, Syed Muhammad Naquib al-Attas, a contemporary Muslim philosopher, and A. K. Narain, Professor and scholar of Indo-Greeks studies, Archeology, Ancient Indian History.
 Noted writers include M. K. Asante author of Buck, filmmaker and professor, Raman Mundair, British poet and playwright. Olu Oguibe, a conceptual artist and academic, Derwin Panda, an electronic musician and producer, Paul Robeson, an American singer who was involved in the Civil Rights Movement, Himanshu Suri aka "Heems", rapper and member of Das Racist, and Dzongsar Jamyang Khyentse Rinpoche, a Bhutanese lama and filmmaker are all alumni of the school.
 In business, alumni include: Fred Eychaner, American businessman and philanthropist, Abdulsalam Haykal, Syrian media entrepreneur, Sir Peter Parker, chairman of the British Railways Board, Lesetja Kganyago, Governor of the South African Reserve Bank, Atiur Rahman, Governor of Bangladesh Bank and Sir Dermot de Trafford, British banker and baronet.

Notable faculty and staff

Notes

References

Further reading

External links

Game, John "The origins of SOAS as a colonial institution, training district"
SOAS Student Union website
SOAS graduates list

1916 establishments in England
Africa-Europe Group for Interdisciplinary Studies
African studies
Asian studies
Charles Holden buildings
Educational institutions established in 1916
Musical instrument museums
 
Universities UK
University of London